Melli Kandi (also Romanized as Mellī Kandī) is a village in Qeshlaq-e Jonubi Rural District, Qeshlaq Dasht District, Bileh Savar County, Ardabil Province, Iran. At the 2006 census, its population was 98, in 18 families.

References 

Tageo

Towns and villages in Bileh Savar County